Fenton Le Roy "Muscles" Mole (June 14, 1925 – February 20, 2017) was an American Major League Baseball player.

Biography
Mole was born in San Leandro, California. He played two seasons for Newark in the minor leagues, 1947 and 1949. He was called up on September 1, 1949. Mole played in ten games for the New York Yankees in the 1949 season. He had five hits in 27 at-bats, with a .185 batting average. Mole batted and threw left-handed. In the field, he accepted 65 total chances (59 putouts, 6 assists) as a first baseman without an error for a 1.000 fielding percentage.  He served in the military during World War II. 

He died on February 20, 2017, at the age of 91.

References

External links 
Fenton Mole statistics and history on Baseball-Reference.com

1925 births
2017 deaths
Baseball players from California
New York Yankees players
People from San Leandro, California
Syracuse Chiefs players
Beaumont Exporters players
Beaumont Roughnecks players
Kansas City Blues (baseball) players
Newark Bears (IL) players
Norfolk Tars players
Portland Beavers players
San Francisco Seals (baseball) players